Robert Wagner (born 1930) is an American actor.

Robert Wagner may also refer to:

 Bob Wagner (born 1947), head football coach at the University of Hawaii, 1988–1995
 Robert F. Wagner (1877–1953), U.S. Senator (D-NY), author Wagner Act enabling labor unions
 Robert F. Wagner Jr. (1910–1991), New York City mayor (1954-1965)
 Robert F. Wagner Jr. (deputy mayor) (1944–1993), New York City deputy mayor
 Robert Heinrich Wagner (1895–1946), Nazi Gauleiter and Reich Governor of Alsace
 Robert R. Wagner (1923–2001), American virologist
 Robert T. Wagner (1932–2011), president of South Dakota State University, 1985–1997
 Tom Wagner (Robert Thomas Wagner Jr.), State Auditor of Delaware since 1989
 Robert Wagner (darts player) (born 1965), darts player from Norway
 Robert Wagner (serial killer) (born 1971), Australian serial killer convicted of 10 murders as part of the Snowtown murders
 Robert Wagner (cyclist) (born 1983), German professional cyclist
 Robert P. Wagner (1918–2004), American professor of genetics
 Rob Wagner (1872–1942), editor and publisher of Script, a weekly literary film magazine
 Rob L. Wagner (born 1954), American journalist covering Middle East issues
 Rob Wagner (politician) (born 1973), Democratic politician from Oregon
 Robert Wagner (footballer) (born 2003), German association football midfielder
 Robert Wagner (chemist), industrial chemist and S.D. and Gestapo officer

See also
 Robert F. Wagner Jr. Institute For Arts & Technology, in Long Island City, Queens
 Robert Wagner House, listed on the National Register of Historic Places, in Illinois